Canadian Children's Book Centre (CCBC) is a national non-profit organization that dedicates its resources to promoting quality Canadian children's literature to parents, librarians, teachers, and youth across Canada. Founded in 1976, the CCBC has library collections in five cities across Canada (Toronto, Vancouver, Edmonton, Winnipeg, and Halifax) with its national office located in Toronto.

Programs 

TD Canadian Children's Book Week

Founded in 1977, TD Canadian Children's Book Week is the largest celebration of Canadian books for young people in Canada. Each spring, authors, illustrators, and storytellers visit communities throughout the country to participate in readings and workshops with Canadian youth. Book week reaches over 35,000 children and teens in schools and libraries across Canada every year. In 2011, Book Week reached new media heights when Canadian television host, Ben Mulroney, was named as the honorary patron for TD Canadian Children's Book Week 2011.

TD Grade One Book Giveaway Program

Founded in 2000, in cooperation with ministries of education, school boards, and library organizations across Canada, the TD Grade One Book Giveaway Program was created in order to provide every Grade One student across Canada with the gift of a free book in either English or French. Over 500,000 free books are distributed annually to children across the country.

Canadian National Children's Book Awards

The Canadian Children's Book Centre, with the help of its sponsors, honours the great achievements of Canadian authors and illustrators through its book awards:
 TD Canadian Children's Literature Award ($25,000)
 Marilyn Baillie Picture Book Award ($20,000)
 Norma Fleck Award for Canadian Children's Non-Fiction ($10,000)
 Geoffrey Bilson Award for Historical Fiction for Young People ($5,000)
 John Spray Mystery Award ($5,000)

Publications 
Canadian Children's Book News

A quarterly magazine, Canadian Children's Book News is a review publication that critiques the latest Canadian children's books. It also has author and illustrator interviews, and profiles of Canadian publishers and bookstores.

Best Books for Kids and Teens

Directed at teachers, librarians, parents, and writers, Best Books for Kids & Teens is a magazine that acts as a guide to the best Canadian children's books, magazines, audio, and video. Each of the selections is handpicked by expert committees of teachers, educators, and librarians across the country.

Get Published: The Writing for Children Kit

A kit for new writers with information on how to submit manuscripts and portfolios, copyright procedures, and a list of current Canadian publishers who accept unsolicited manuscripts.

Directory of Authors, Illustrators, and Storytellers 
The CCBC has an online directory listing authors, illustrators, and storytellers available for school and library visits. Each listing includes the presenter's contact information and reading workshop descriptions.

References 

Non-profit organizations based in Toronto
Child-related organizations in Canada
Children's books